The tenth edition of Dancing Stars was broadcast from March 4, 2016 on ORF1 and was presented by Mirjam Weichselbraun and Klaus Eberhartinger.

Couples

Scoreboard

Average Chart

Dances

Weekly dances and scores

Week 1

Week 2

Week 3

Week 4

Week 5

Week 6

Week 7

Week 8

Dance Chart

 Highest scoring dance
 Lowest scoring dance
 Not scored or danced by the celebrity
 Danced, but not scored

Notes

References
Official website of Dancing Stars

Season 10
2016 Austrian television seasons